cAMP-specific 3',5'-cyclic phosphodiesterase 4B is an enzyme that in humans is encoded by the PDE4B gene.

This gene is a member of the type IV, cyclic AMP (cAMP)-specific, cyclic nucleotide phosphodiesterase (PDE) family. Cyclic nucleotides are important second messengers that regulate and mediate a number of cellular responses to extracellular signals, such as hormones, light, and neurotransmitters. The cyclic nucleotide phosphodiesterases (PDEs) regulate the cellular concentrations of cyclic nucleotides and thereby play a role in signal transduction. This gene encodes a protein that specifically hydrolyzes cAMP. Alternate transcriptional splice variants, encoding different isoforms, have been characterized.

Clinical relevance

Altered activity of this protein has been associated with schizophrenia and bipolar disorder. PDE4B is believed to be the PDE4 subtype involved in the antipsychotic effects of PDE4 inhibitors such as rolipram. PDE4B is involved in dopamine-associated and stress-related behaviours. It has also recently been found to modulate cognition, as reduction in PDE4B activity improves memory and long-term plasticity in mouse models, possibly supporting further therapeutic applications.

Inhibitors 

AN2728, a boron-containing drug candidate that as of 2015 was under development by Anacor Pharmaceuticals for the topical treatment of psoriasis and atopic dermatitis (atopic eczema). mainly acting on PDE4B.

References

Further reading